The Miles M.6 Hawcon was a 1930s British experimental monoplane designed by Miles Aircraft Limited. The Hawcon name comes from a combination of Hawk and Falcon.

Design and development
The M.6 Hawcon was a one-off experimental monoplane designed for thick-wing research by the Royal Aircraft Establishment. The Hawcon combined parts from both the Hawk and Falcon and was powered by a 200 hp (149 kW) de Havilland Gipsy Six piston engine.

Operational history
The aircraft, serial number K5925, was used for thick-wing research by the Royal Aircraft Establishment. It had four interchangeable wings of different thickness.  The aim was to investigate the performance penalties of thicker wings, which had structural advantages (lower weight for the same strength) and provided space for fuel etc.

The four wings, labelled A to D had root thickness to chord ratios of 0.15, 0.20, 0.25 and 0.30.  The trials showed that the thickness had little effect on maximum speed: wing B was faster than A by 5 m.p.h. (less than 3%) and the other wings fell between.  The maximum speed given below is for the D wing, as are the dimensions and weights.

For comparison, modern low Mach number aircraft have root thickness to chord ratios of 0.14 - 0.20.

Operators

Royal Aircraft Establishment

Specifications (M.6)

See also

References

Notes

Bibliography

 Amos, Peter. and Brown, Don Lambert. Miles Aircraft Since 1925, Volume 1. London: Putnam Aeronautical, 2000. .  
 Brown, Don Lambert. Miles Aircraft Since 1925. London: Putnam & Company Ltd., 1970. . 
 The Illustrated Encyclopedia of Aircraft (Part Work 1982-1985). Orbis Publishing.
 Jackson, A.J. British Civil Aircraft since 1919. London: Putnam, 1974. .
 Jackson, A.J. British Civil Aircraft since 1919, Volume 3. London: Putnam, 1988. .
Lukins, A.H. and Russell, D.A. The book of Miles aircraft.  Leicester UK: Harborough 1945
Fielding, John P. Introduction to Aircraft Design, Cambridge UK:Cambridge University Press 1999.  .

1930s British experimental aircraft
Hawcon
Single-engined tractor aircraft
Aircraft first flown in 1935